Kenny Bernard Taylor (born December 6, 1982) is an American former professional basketball player for the Akita Northern Happinets of the Japanese bj league. He played college basketball for Baylor University  and University of Texas.

College statistics

|-
| style="text-align:left;"| 2001-02
| style="text-align:left;"| Baylor
| 21 || 0 || 7.1 || .450 || .391 || .750|| 0.7 ||0.2 || 0.2 ||0.0 || 3.9
|-
| style="text-align:left;"| 2002-03
| style="text-align:left;"| Baylor
| 28 || 28 ||26.7 || .405 || .390 || .733|| 2.1 ||1.5  || 1.4 || 0.1 ||11.8
|-
| style="text-align:left;"| 2003-04
| style="text-align:left;"| Texas
| 33 || 2 || 19.0 || .363 || .358 || .813|| 1.8 ||1.2  || 0.8 || 0.1 || 7.3
|-
| style="text-align:left;"| 2004-05
| style="text-align:left;"| Texas
| 31 || 21 || 28.6 || .401 || .361 || .625|| 3.8 ||2.6  || 1.0 || 0.1 || 10.6
|-
|- class="sortbottom"
! style="text-align:center;" colspan=2| Career
! 113 || 51 || 21.3 || .396 || .373 || .719 || 2.2 || 1.5 ||0.9 || 0.1 || 8.7

NCAA Awards & Honors
Big 12 All-Improved Team (Media) - 2003

Career statistics

Regular season 

|-
| align="left" | 2005-06
| align="left" | Zagreb
|16 ||   || 35.1 ||.434  || .355 ||.685  ||2.8 || 3.3 || 1.3 ||0.1  ||15.4
|-
| align="left" | 2005-06
| align="left" | Aris
|6 ||0 || 7.3 ||.222  || .000 ||.750  ||0.67 || 0.17 || 0.00 ||0.17  ||1.17
|-
| align="left" | 2006-07
| align="left" | Palma
|18 ||   || 24.1 ||.342  || .325 ||.700  ||2.4 || 2.7 || 0.8 ||0.1  ||8.3
|-
| align="left" | 2006-07
| align="left" | Zagreb
|8 ||   || 35.3 ||.395  || .386 ||.750  ||3.8 || 3.1 || 1.3 ||0.1  ||12.4
|-
| align="left" | 2007-08
| align="left" | Kolossos
|14 ||   || 30.7 ||.412  || .373 ||.700  ||2.6 || 2.3 || 1.1 ||0.1  ||10.0
|-
| align="left" | 2007-08
| align="left" | RGV
|14 ||12 || 34.9 ||.437  || .462 ||.818  ||4.21 || 2.71 || 0.71 ||0.07  ||15.43
|-
| align="left" | 2010-11
| align="left" | BAK/IWA
|45 ||2 || 19.1 ||.354  || .360 ||.828  ||1.93 || 1.11|| 0.60 ||0.07  ||7.76
|-
| align="left" | 2011-12
| align="left" | Akita
|8 ||2 || 14.8 ||.309  || .267 ||.750  || 3.1 || 1.4 || 0.9 ||0.0  ||7.5 
|-

Playoffs 

|-
|style="text-align:left;"|2010-11
|style="text-align:left;"|IWA
| 8 || 0 ||22.5 || .404 || .393 || .571 || 2.25 || 0.75 || 0.88 || 0.12 ||6.62
|-

References

1982 births
Living people
Akita Northern Happinets players
American expatriate basketball people in Bosnia and Herzegovina
American expatriate basketball people in Croatia
American expatriate basketball people in Cyprus
American expatriate basketball people in Greece
American expatriate basketball people in Japan
American expatriate basketball people in Mexico
American expatriate basketball people in Spain
American expatriate basketball people in Venezuela
American men's basketball players
Aris B.C. players
Bakersfield Jam players
Basketball players from Texas
Baylor Bears men's basketball players
Correcaminos UAT Victoria players
Iowa Energy players
Keravnos B.C. players
KK Igokea players
KK Zagreb players
Kolossos Rodou B.C. players
Marinos B.B.C. players
Rio Grande Valley Vipers players
Texas Longhorns men's basketball players
Trotamundos B.B.C. players
UB La Palma players
Shooting guards